Alstermo IF is a Swedish sports club located in Alstermo, with several sections:

 Alstermo IF Handboll, handball section
 Alstermo IF Fotboll - football section
 Alstermo IF Skidor, skiing section
 Alstermo IF Gymnastik, gymnastics section
 Alstermo IF Orientering, orienteering section